DOV 216,303 is an experimental antidepressant drug originally developed by DOV Pharmaceutical and was licensed to Merck & Co. in 2004; Merck and DOV terminated their relationship in December 2006.

It is a triple reuptake inhibitor (TRI), or serotonin-norepinephrine-dopamine reuptake inhibitor (SNDRI). It is the racemic mixture of amitifadine (DOV-21,947) and its (–)-enantiomer, DOV-102,677.  Its IC50 values for SERT, NET, and DAT are Ki 14 nM, 20 nM, and 78 nM, respectively. 

As of March 2008, DOV had no intention to further develop DOV-216,303 because the patent on the compound had expired.

In a mouse model, DOV-216,303 has shown the ability to promote recovery after spinal cord contusion.

See also 
 Bicifadine

References 

Chloroarenes
Serotonin–norepinephrine–dopamine reuptake inhibitors
Abandoned drugs